Weissberger’s modified exponential decay model, or simply, Weissberger’s model, is a radio wave propagation model that estimates the path loss due to the presence of one or more trees in a point-to-point telecommunication link. This model belongs to the category  Foliage or Vegetation models.

Applicable to/under conditions

 This model is applicable to the cases of line of sight propagation. Example is microwave transmission.
 This model is only applicable when there is an obstruction made by some foliage in the link. i.e. In between the transmitter and receiver.
 This model is ideal for application in the situation where the LOS path is blocked by dense, dry and leafy trees.

Coverage

Frequency: 230 MHz to 95 GHz

Depth of foliage: up to 400 m

History

Formulated in 1982, this model is a development of the ITU Model for Exponential Decay (MED).

Mathematical formulation

Weissberger’s model is formally expressed as

 

where,

L = The loss due to foliage. Unit: decibels (dB)

f = The transmission frequency. Unit: gigahertz (GHz)

d = The depth of foliage along the path. Unit: meters (m)

Points to note

 The equation is scaled for frequency specified in GHz range. 
 Depth of foliage must be specified in meters (m).

Limitations

This model is significant for frequency range 230 MHz to 95 GHz only, as pointed out by Blaunstein.
This model does not define the operation if the depth of vegetation is more than 400 m.
This model predicts the loss due to foliage. The path loss must be calculated with inclusion of the free space loss.

See also
 Fresnel zone
 Radio propagation model

References

Further reading

 Introduction to RF Propagation, John S. Seybold, 2005, John Wiley and Sons.
 Radio Propagation in Cellular Networks, N. Blaunstein, 2000, Artech House
 The Mobile Radio Propagation Channel, J. D. Parsons, 2000, Wiley
 

Radio frequency propagation model